John F. Bacon (February 2, 1789 in Great Barrington, Berkshire County, Massachusetts – February 25, 1860 in Nassau, The Bahamas) was an American lawyer, diplomat and politician from New York.

Life 
He was Clerk of the New York State Senate from January 1814 to January 1840.

In March 1840, he was appointed U.S. Consul at Nassau, in the Bahamas, then a British crown colony, and remained on the post until November 1841. In 1844, he was Deputy New York State Treasurer.

In March 1846, he was again appointed U.S. Consul at Nassau, and remained on the post until 1850.

In July 1853, he was again appointed U.S. Consul at Nassau, and resigned the post in 1856.

Sources 
The New York Civil List compiled by Franklin Benjamin Hough (Weed, Parsons and Co., 1858; pg. 122–132)
Niles' National Register (issue of March 28, 1840; pg. 51)
Register of All Officers, Civil, Military, and Naval, in the Service of the United States (Washington D.C., 1843; pg. 7)
Niles' National Register (issue of March 7, 1846; pg. 1)
Appointments, etc. in NYT on July 23, 1853
Death notice in The Historical Magazine (New York City, 1860; Vol. IV, pg. 157)
Manual for the Use of the Legislature (1845; pg. 241)

1789 births
1860 deaths
American consuls
People from Great Barrington, Massachusetts
Politicians from Albany, New York
People from Nassau, Bahamas
19th-century American diplomats
Lawyers from Albany, New York
19th-century American lawyers